Johan Jonatan Assaf "John" Jarlén (4 November 1880 – 18 April 1955) was a Swedish gymnast  who competed in the 1908 Summer Olympics. He was a member of the Swedish team that won the all-around gold medal. He later worked as an architect in Göteborg.

References

1880 births
1955 deaths
Swedish male artistic gymnasts
Gymnasts at the 1908 Summer Olympics
Olympic gymnasts of Sweden
Olympic gold medalists for Sweden
Olympic medalists in gymnastics
Medalists at the 1908 Summer Olympics
Sportspeople from Gothenburg